Sardoba is a district of Sirdaryo Region in Uzbekistan. The capital lies at the town Paxtaobod. The district consists of one urban-type settlement (Paxtaobod) and 6 rural communities.

Until 2004, the district was known as Sharof Rashidov District, commemorating the politician Sharof Rashidov.

References

Districts of Uzbekistan
Sirdaryo Region